The Chennai Central–Tirupati Express is an Express train belonging to Southern Railway zone that runs between  and  in India. It is currently being operated with 16053/16054 train numbers on a daily basis.

Service

The 16053/Chennai Central–Tirupati Express has an average speed of 43 km/hr and covers 147 km in 3h 25m. The 16054/Tirupati–Chennai Central Express has an average speed of 40 km/hr and covers 147 km in 3h 40m.

Route and halts 

The important halts of the train are:

Coach composition

The train has standard ICF rakes with a max speed of 110 kmph. The train consists of 18 coaches:

 1 AC Chair Car
 7 Second Sitting
 8 General Unreserved

Traction

Both trains are hauled by an Arakkonam Loco Shed based WAG-7 or WAM-4 electric locomotive from Chennai to Tirupati and vice versa.

Direction reversal

The train reverses its direction 1 times:

Rake sharing

The train shares its rake with 16057/16058 Sapthagiri Express

See also 

 Tirupati railway station
 Chennai Central railway station
 Sapthagiri Express

Notes

References

External links 

 16053/Chennai Central - Tirupati Express
 16054/Tirupati - Chennai Central Express

Transport in Chennai
Transport in Tirupati
Express trains in India
Rail transport in Andhra Pradesh
Rail transport in Tamil Nadu